Calvin Duncan may refer to:

Calvin Duncan (basketball)
Calvin Duncan (police)